David Wise  (May 10, 1930 – October 8, 2018) was an American journalist and author who worked for the New York Herald-Tribune in the 1950s and 1960s, and published a series of non-fiction books on espionage and US politics as well as several spy novels. His book The Politics of Lying: Government Deception, Secrecy, and Power (1973) won the George Polk Award (Book category, 1973), and the George Orwell Award (1975).

Early life 
Wise was born in Manhattan, New York City, New York.

Education 
In 1951, Wise graduated from Columbia University, where he was editor-in-chief of the Columbia Daily Spectator.

Career 
In 1951, Wise joined the New York Herald-Tribune and became the paper's White House correspondent in 1960. He was chief of the paper's Washington, D.C. bureau from 1963 to 1966. In 1970–71 he was a Fellow of the Woodrow Wilson International Center for Scholars, and in  1977–79, he lectured in political science at the University of California, Santa Barbara. He was later a commentator on intelligence issues for CNN for six years.

Beginning in 1962 with an examination of the Lockheed U-2, Wise published a series of non-fiction books, the first three with Thomas B. Ross. Their book Invisible Government (1964), exposed the role of the Central Intelligence Agency (CIA) in foreign policy. This included CIA coups in Guatemala (Operation PBSuccess) and Iran (Operation Ajax) and the Bay of Pigs Invasion. It also revealed the CIA's attempts to overthrow President Sukarno in Indonesia and the covert operations taking place in Laos and Vietnam. Wise and Ross claimed that the CIA considered buying up the entire printing of Invisible Government, but this idea was rejected when Random House pointed out that if this happened they would have to print a second edition. A confidential CIA review of Invisible Government, declassified in 1995, declared that "In Great Britain, which is second to none in its devotion to liberty, there exists an Official Secrets Act under which the authors would have been tried and sentenced to prison. … That much of this material has been printed before does not reduce the value to the Soviets of having it gathered in one volume under such genuine American auspices." Invisible Government also revealed the name and existence of the National Security Council covert operations sub-committee known as the 303 Group, prompting its renaming to the 40 Committee.
 
Wise's book The Politics of Lying: Government Deception, Secrecy, and Power (1973) won the George Polk Award (Book category, 1973), and the George Orwell Award (1975). Later works include Cassidy's Run: The Secret Spy War Over Nerve Gas (2000) on Operation Shocker, and Spy: The Inside Story of How the FBI's Robert Hanssen Betrayed America, (2002), on Robert Hanssen.

Wise also published several novels, including Spectrum (1981), based on the 1965 The Apollo Affair.

Personal life 
On October 8, 2018, Wise died from pancreatic cancer in Washington, D.C. He was 88 years old.

Books
 The U-2 Affair (with Thomas B. Ross), Random House, 1962
 The Invisible Government (with Thomas B. Ross), Random House, 1964
 The Espionage Establishment (with Thomas B. Ross), Random House, 1967
 The Politics of Lying: Government Deception, Secrecy, and Power, Random House, 1973
 The American Police State: The Government Against the People, Random House, 1976
 Spectrum, Viking Press, 1981 (novel)
 The Children's Game, Doubleday, 1983 (novel)
 The Samarkand Dimension, St. Martin's/Marek, 1987 (novel)
 The Spy Who Got Away, Random House, 1988 
 Molehunt: The Secret Search for Traitors that Shattered the CIA, Random House, 1992
 Nightmover: How Aldrich Ames Sold The CIA To The KGB For $4.6m, 1995
 Cassidy's Run: The Secret Spy War Over Nerve Gas, Random House, 2000
 Spy: The Inside Story of How the FBI's Robert Hanssen Betrayed America,  Random House, 2002
 Democracy Under Pressure: An Introduction to the American Political System (with Milton C. Cummings, Jr.), 2004
 Tiger Trap: America's Secret Spy War with China, Houghton Mifflin Harcourt, 2011

Awards
 1973 George Polk Award (Book category), for The Politics of Lying
 1975 Orwell Award, for The Politics of Lying

References

External links

 David Wise at goodreads.com
 Literary agent Sterling Lord discusses his representation of Invisible Government.

1930 births
2018 deaths
People from Manhattan
American reporters and correspondents
New York Herald Tribune people
American spy fiction writers
American non-fiction writers
University of California, Santa Barbara faculty
George Polk Award recipients
American male novelists
Novelists from New York (state)
Deaths from cancer in Washington, D.C.
Deaths from pancreatic cancer
American male non-fiction writers
Historians of the Central Intelligence Agency
Columbia College (New York) alumni